This is a list of animated television series first aired in 1996.

Anime television series first aired in 1996

See also
 List of animated feature films of 1996
 List of Japanese animation television series of 1996

References

Television series
Animated series
1996
1996
1996-related lists